CITY College, University of York Europe Campus is a unique, international institution based in Thessaloniki, Greece but with satellite activities in 8 countries.

History
CITY College is widely recognised throughout the region for its academic excellence. Throughout its 30 years of legacy, it has continued to connect the UK with the whole region, Europe, and the world.

CITY College, University of York Europe Campus embraces internationalisation and gives its students the very best experiences, curricula and traditions of the acclaimed British higher education. It transfers knowledge, in-depth research and academic excellence across the region through its educational networks in order to build capacity and support the academic and professional aspirations of the students and their communities.

There is a dynamic international environment across CITY's educational bases comprising students and highly qualified faculty members from more than 60 countries, who speak over 20 languages. This provides students with the opportunity to benefit from different perspectives and gain a greater understanding of the wider world in a truly unique English language learning environment.

CITY College, University of York Europe Campus is a joint community with the University of York that strives to create an inclusive international community which will contribute to the public good; advance the development of people and the societies in the region; connect academic, research, government, and corporate networks throughout the region to create and share new knowledge; and create new opportunities for all.

Organisation
Today CITY College consists of 4 academic departments:
The Business Administration & Economics Department
The Computer Science Department
The Psychology Department
The Humanities Department

Courses offered in Thessaloniki
CITY College offers a variety of undergraduate and postgraduate courses in Thessaloniki, leading to the award of a degree by the University of York:

Undergraduate studies
BA (Hons) in Business Studies (Accounting and Finance)
BA (Hons) in Business Studies (Management)
BA (Hons) in Business Studies (Marketing) 
BA (Hons) in Business Studies (Hotel and Hospitality Management)
BSc (Hons) in Computer Science
BSc (Hons) in Computer Science (Artificial Intelligence and Data Science)
BSc (Hons) in Computer Science (Business Informatics)
BSc (Hons) in Computer Science (Web Technologies)
BSc (Hons) in Psychology 
BA (Hons) in Communication and Digital Media
BA (Hons) in English Language, Linguistics and Literature

Postgraduate studies
MSc in Business Analytics and Decision Sciences
MA in Digital Marketing and Social Media
MSc in Business Management and Technology
MSc in Finance and Banking
MSc in Finance and Risk Management
MSc in Management (General)
MSc in Management (Human Resource Management)
MSc in Management (Logistics and Supply Chain Management)
MA in Marketing, Advertising and Public Relations
MSc in Neuromarketing
MSc in Shipping, Port Management and Logistics
MA in Clinical Neuropsychology
MSc in Clinical Psychology
MSc in Cognitive Neuropsychology
MSc in Counselling & Psychotherapy
MSc in Counselling Psychology
MA in Counselling Psychology with a Practicum
MSc in Artificial Intelligence and Data Science
MSc in Software Development
MSc in Software Development with Industry Placement
MSc in Web and Mobile Development
MA in Applied Linguistics with TESOL
MA in International Relations and European Union Studies
MA in Translation and Interpreting

Master of Business Administration (Executive MBA)
MBA in General Management
MBA in Marketing
MBA in Finance
MBA in Logistics and Supply Chain Management
MBA in Healthcare Management
MBA in Human Resource Management

Doctoral studies 
PhD studies can be pursued through the University of York Doctoral Programme supported by the South-East European Research Centre (SEERC).

Courses offered in South-East and Eastern Europe and the Caucasus region

Except for the programmes delivered at the main campus in Thessaloniki, Greece, CITY College offers a series of undergraduate and postgraduate programmes in other countries of the South East and Eastern Europe and the Caucasus region giving the opportunity to students to study in their own country (partially or wholly) and pursue a University of York degree.

Belgrade, Serbia
Master of Business Administration (Executive MBA)

Sofia, Bulgaria
BA in Business Studies (Accounting and Finance)
BA in Business Studies (Management)
BA in Business Studies (Marketing)
BA in Business Studies (Hotel and Hospitality Management)
BA in English Language and Professional Communication
MA in Digital Marketing and Social Media
MSc in Finance and Banking
MA in Marketing, Advertising & Public Relations
MSc in Management of Business, Innovation and Technology
MA in Clinical Neuropsychology
MA in Cognitive Neuropsychology
Master of Business Administration (Executive MBA)

Kyiv, Ukraine
Master of Business Administration (Executive MBA)

Bucharest, Romania
Master of Business Administration (Executive MBA)

Yerevan, Armenia
Master of Business Administration (Executive MBA)

Tbilisi, Georgia
Master of Business Administration (Executive MBA)

Baku, Azerbaijan
Master of Business Administration (Executive MBA)

Accreditation and recognition
CITY College is accredited and recognised by a range of highly acclaimed professional international bodies and accrediting organizations:

AMBA - Association of MBAs
CMI - Chartered Management Institute
BCS - British Computer Society
BPS - British Psychological Society
BAC - British Accreditation Council
QAA - Quality Assurance Agency for Higher Education

University of York